Gilberto Chocce (born 22 March 1950) is a former Peruvian cyclist. He competed in the individual road race and team time trial events at the 1972 Summer Olympics.

References

External links
 

1950 births
Living people
Peruvian male cyclists
Olympic cyclists of Peru
Cyclists at the 1972 Summer Olympics
Place of birth missing (living people)
20th-century Peruvian people